Faster Than the Speed of Night is the fifth studio album by Welsh singer Bonnie Tyler. It was released first in Europe on 8 April 1983 and later that year in the US through Columbia Records. Tyler had changed musical direction and soon after began working with Jim Steinman, who produced the album and wrote its most successful single "Total Eclipse of the Heart".

Faster Than the Speed of Night reached No. 1 in the UK Albums Chart, and was certified Silver in the UK, Platinum in the US, and Double Platinum in Canada.

Content
The album contains five dramatically re-worked cover songs, produced in the model of Phil Spector's Wall of Sound, including the Creedence Clearwater Revival hit "Have You Ever Seen the Rain?". "Goin' Through the Motions" is a cover of the song by Blue Öyster Cult from their 1977 album Spectres, while "Straight from the Heart" was the break-out Top 10 hit for Canadian rock singer/songwriter Bryan Adams from his platinum album Cuts Like a Knife. "Getting So Excited" was a cover of a song by British singer Lee Kosmin (with a short spoken interlude recited by Steinman inserted after the second verse: "I'd do anything for love, but I won't do that"). Another song, "Tears", was originally written and performed by Frankie Miller for his 1980 album Easy Money; for this album, Tyler performed the song as a duet with Miller.

The album also includes four original songs produced in the same manner, two of which were written and composed by Steinman himself: the title track and the international No. 1 hit "Total Eclipse of the Heart". "Take Me Back" was written by Billy Cross, a former Bob Dylan guitarist.  Additionally, this contains the initial recording of "It's a Jungle Out There", written by Dennis Polen, Paul Pilger, and William Moloney, which was picked up and re-recorded (in a shorter version) by '70s pop group Three Dog Night for their 1983 EP It's a Jungle.

Track listing

Personnel

Musicians
Bonnie Tyler – vocals
Roy Bittan – piano, organ on track 8
Larry Fast – synthesizers
Rick Derringer – guitars
Steve Buslowe – bass
Max Weinberg – drums
Jimmy Maelen – percussion
Eric Troyer – backing vocals
Holly Sherwood – backing vocals on track 4
Rory Dodd – backing vocals, vocal on track 4

"It's a Jungle Out There"
Paul Shaffer – organ (also organ on track 7)
Hiram Bullock – guitars
Will Lee – bass
Steve Jordan – drums
Jimmy Maelen – percussion

Additional musicians 
Dave LeBolt – additional synthesizer on track 1
Steve Margoshes – all keyboards on track 2
Holly Sherwood – backing vocals & wailing on track 2
Martin Briley – additional guitars on track 2
Stephanie Black, Erika Katz, Brian Pew, Edward Skylar, Tristine Skylar, David Varga – children's chorus on track 6
Frankie Miller – male vocal on track 7

Production
Produced & directed by Jim Steinman; associate producer: John Jansen
Arranged by Roy Bittan & Jim Steinman, except track 2 (arranged by Steve Margoshes & Jim Steinman)
Recording engineers: Neil Dorfsman (basic track recording), Rod Hui; chief recording engineer: John Jansen
Additional recording by Frank Filipetti & Scott Litt
Recorded at The Power Station, Greene Street Studio, Right Track Studios
Mixed by Neil Dorfsman, John Jansen & Jim Steinman, except track 2 (mixed by John Jansen, Scott Litt & Jim Steinman)
Mixed at The Power Station
Mastered by Greg Calbi at Sterling Sound

Charts

Weekly charts

Year-end charts

Certifications and sales

References

1983 albums
Bonnie Tyler albums
Albums produced by Jim Steinman
Columbia Records albums